Polyctenium fremontii, the desert combleaf, is a small and compact plant native to the western United States. It is named both in English and Greek for its deeply lobed leaves, which almost appear to be pinnately compound. It takes the other portion of its scientific name from John C. Frémont. Leaves have forked hairs, and the distal end of the leaf often has a single hair at the very tip. As is characteristic of the broccoli family, the white flowers have four petals in the shape of a cross. The flowers appear in clusters at the ends of the stems.

This plant is among the first plants of sagebrush country in the inland western U.S. to bloom in spring. It is found on the banks of seasonal streams and similar places.

External links

Jepson Manual Treatment of Polyctenium fremontii
USDA Plants Profile for Polyctenium fremontii (Desert combleaf)
Polyctenium fremontii — U.C. Photo gallery

Brassicaceae
Flora of California
Flora of Idaho
Flora of Nevada
Flora of Oregon
Flora of the California desert regions
Flora of the Great Basin
John C. Frémont
Taxa named by Edward Lee Greene
Taxa named by Sereno Watson
Flora without expected TNC conservation status